Tikhmenevo may refer to:
Tikhmenevo, Sakhalin Oblast, a former urban-type settlement in Sakhalin Oblast, Russia; since 2005—a settlement of rural type 
Tikhmenevo, Yaroslavl Oblast, a former urban-type settlement in Yaroslavl Oblast, Russia; since 1999—a settlement of rural type 
Tikhmenevo, name of several other rural localities in Russia